In Concert with The London Symphony Orchestra (also cited as In Concert with The London Symphony Orchestra Conducted by Paul Mann) is a live album and DVD by the British hard rock band Deep Purple, recorded on 25–26 September 1999 at the Royal Albert Hall in London with the London Symphony Orchestra, and released on 8 February 2000 on Eagle Records.

The album was a project started in 1999 by keyboardist Jon Lord, who sought to recreate the band's innovative 1969 album, Concerto for Group and Orchestra, of which the original score was lost. With the help of Marco de Goeij, a fan who was also a musicologist and composer, the two painstakingly recreated the lost score, and Lord elected to have the band perform it once more at the Royal Albert Hall, but this time with the London Symphony Orchestra rather than the Royal Philharmonic Orchestra, and with Paul Mann as conductor rather than Malcolm Arnold. The concert also featured songs from each member's solo careers, as well as a short Deep Purple set, and guest musicians such as Ronnie James Dio, the Steve Morse Band, and Sam Brown. In early 2001, two similar concerts were also performed in Tokyo, and were released as part of the Soundboard Series box set.

Track listings

Single disc version
Released in 1999.
"Concerto for Group and Orchestra, Mov. 1" – 17:03
"Concerto for Group and Orchestra, Mov. 2" – 19:43
"Concerto for Group and Orchestra, Mov. 3" – 13:28
"Wring That Neck" – 4:38
"Pictures of Home" – 9:56
"Smoke on the Water" – 6:43

DVD
"Pictured Within"
"Wait a While"
"Sitting in a Dream"
"Love Is All"
"Wring That Neck"
"Concerto for Group and Orchestra, Movement I"
"Concerto for Group and Orchestra, Movement II"
"Concerto for Group and Orchestra, Movement III"
"Ted the Mechanic"
"Watching the Sky"
"Sometimes I Feel Like Screaming"
"Pictures of Home"
"Smoke on the Water"

Personnel
Deep Purple
Ian Gillan – vocals
Steve Morse – guitar
Jon Lord – keyboards
Roger Glover – bass
Ian Paice – drums

The London Symphony Orchestra 
Paul Mann – conductor

Additional musicians
Ronnie James Dio – lead vocals on "Sitting in a Dream", "Love Is All"
Aitch McRobbie, Margo Buchanan, Pete Brown – backing vocals
 – vocals, percussion
Sam Brown – backing vocals, lead vocals on "Wait a While"
Miller Anderson – lead vocals on "Pictured Within"
 – violin on "Love Is All"
Steve Morris – guitar on "That's Why God Is Singing the Blues"
Eddie Hardin – piano on "Love Is All"
Annie Whitehead – trombone
Paul Spong – trumpet, flugelhorn
Roddy Lorimer – trumpet, flugelhorn
Simon C. Clarke – baritone, alto sax, flute
Tim Sanders – tenor sax, soprano sax
Dave LaRue – bass
Van Romaine – drums

Production
Recorded with The Manor Mobile
Shaun Defeo, Will Shapland – engineers, mixing at Real World Studios, Box, Wiltshire, England
Alex Goodison – assistant engineer

Charts

References

2000 live albums
Deep Purple live albums
2000 video albums
Deep Purple video albums
Live video albums
Live albums recorded at the Royal Albert Hall
Eagle Rock Entertainment live albums
Eagle Rock Entertainment video albums
London Symphony Orchestra albums
Collaborative albums